Tessin may refer to:

People
 Carl Gustaf Tessin, a Swedish Count and politician
 Nicodemus Tessin the Elder, a Swedish architect
 Nicodemus Tessin the Younger, a Swedish Baroque architect, city planner, and administrator

Places

Poland and Czech Republic
 Cieszyn, a border-town in southern Poland

Switzerland
 Canton of Ticino (German: Tessin; French: Tessin; Romansh: Tessin; Italian: Ticino)
 Ticino (river), running in Switzerland and Italy

Germany
 Tessin, Germany, a town in the district of Bad Doberan in Mecklenburg-Vorpommern
 Tessin (Amt), a union of communes in the district of Bad Doberan in Mecklenburg-Vorpommern
 Tessin bei Boizenburg in the district of Ludwigslust in Mecklenburg-Vorpommern
 a part of the commune Wittendörp in the district of Ludwigslust in Mecklenburg-Vorpommern
 a part of the commune Kuhlen-Wendorf in the district of Parchim in Mecklenburg-Vorpommern